Karan Singh Arora is an Indian singer, music director and songwriter and music performer.

Early life 
Arora hails from Ranchi, Jharkhand, currently based in Mumbai, India. Arora went to Army Public School, Ramgarh Cantt. and later attended Delhi Public School, Ranchi. He was doing BBA from Wadia College in Pune, but left his studies to pursue his career in music. Arora has done his studies in sound engineering and electronic music production from SAE Institute, London.

Career 
He made his singing debut at the age of nineteen with the song Shiv Shankar, which released in March 2015, was well received.

One of his songs, RelationShit, which was released on Valentine's Day in February 2017, went popular amongst different Viners on YouTube.

In April 2018, Karan collaborated with Pakistani singer Salman Mithani for a single titled Tu Jo Kahe, which got picked by Zee Music Company. The song received 1.2 million views on YouTube in two days since it was released online, as reported by Gulf News.

In July 2018, he released his new Punjabi song "Magnet", featuring Nataša Stanković and the music was given by Jass Singh.

Discography

Singles 
The singles released by Arora include:

References

External links 
 Karan Singh Arora on Gaana
 Karan Singh Arora on Hungama.com
 Karan Singh Arora on iTune

Living people
Indian rappers
Singers from Jharkhand
21st-century Indian singers
Punjabi-language singers
1995 births
21st-century Indian male singers